Emad Fathy (born 6 January 1993), is an Egyptian footballer who plays for Egyptian Premier League side Al Masry SC as a midfielder.

Honours

Zamalek

Egypt Cup: 2017–18

References

1993 births
Living people
Egyptian footballers
Association football midfielders
Egyptian Premier League players
Damietta SC players
Misr Lel Makkasa SC players
Zamalek SC players
ENPPI SC players
Al Masry SC players